Warwick Anthony Saupold (born 16 January 1990), nicknamed "Aussie", is an Australian former professional baseball pitcher. He previously played in Major League Baseball (MLB) for the Detroit Tigers and in the KBO League for the Hanwha Eagles. Saupold has also played all eight seasons of the Australian Baseball League (ABL) with the Perth Heat, and represented Australia.

Career
Saupold played for the Australian national baseball team in the 2008 World Junior Baseball Championship.

Saupold joined the Perth Heat of the Australian Baseball League (ABL) in 2010. In the 2011–12 ABL season, Saupold led the league in innings pitched (70) and posted a 1.41 earned run average, setting an ABL record. Saupold also struck out 53 batters, allowing 43 hits, 22 base on balls, and two home runs. Saupold was invited to the 2011 Australian Baseball League All-Star Game.

Detroit Tigers
In 2012, Saupold signed a minor league contract with the Detroit Tigers. Pitching for the Lakeland Flying Tigers in the Class A-Advanced Florida State League (FSL), Saupold won the deciding game in the FSL championship series.

The Tigers promoted Saupold to the Erie SeaWolves of the Double-A Eastern League in 2013. Saupold pitched for Erie in 2014 and 2015. He set the SeaWolves' franchise strikeout record with 275 career strikeouts. During the 2015 season, he received a promotion to the Toledo Mud Hens of the Triple-A International League during the 2015 season.

2016 season
Saupold was called up by the Detroit Tigers on 13 May 2016. Prior to being promoted, he was 3–1 with a 2.37 ERA and 14 strikeouts in  innings for the Toledo Mud Hens. He made his Major League debut for the Tigers the next day in a game against the Baltimore Orioles. On 15 May, Saupold pitched  innings of scoreless relief against the Orioles and earned his first Major League win. On 1 June 2016 Saupold was placed on the 15-day disabled list with a right groin strain.

2017 season
Saupold began the 2017 season with the Toledo Mud Hens. He was called up to the Tigers on 18 April 2017, but pitched in only two games before being returned to Toledo. He was recalled again on 22 May, following the demotion of Aníbal Sánchez. Saupold logged  innings for the 2017 Tigers, posting a 3–2 record with a 4.88 ERA and 44 strikeouts.

2018 season
Saupold began the 2018 season in the Tigers bullpen. He was credited with his first Major League save when he pitched  innings to close out a win over the Kansas City Royals on 21 April. He was designated for assignment on 28 July 2018. After clearing waivers, Saupold was sent outright to the Toledo Mud Hens on 30 July 2018. He elected free agency on 2 November 2018.

Hanwha Eagles
On 13 November 2018, Saupold signed with the Hanwha Eagles of the KBO League. He posted a 12–11 record with a 3.51 ERA and 135 strikeouts over 192.1 innings in 2019. He re-signed with the club for the 2020 season. In 2020, he pitched to a 10–13 record with a 4.91 ERA and 97 strikeouts over 165 innings. Saupold became a free agent following the season.

International career
Saupold was selected for the Australian national baseball team  at the 2013 World Baseball Classic, 2017 World Baseball Classic Qualification in 2016, and 2017 World Baseball Classic. In the 2017 World Baseball Classic, Saupold started and pitched four scoreless innings in Australia's 4-3 loss to Cuba.

Personal life
On 28 August 2016, Saupold was charged with assault following an altercation outside of the Bronze Boar bar in Toledo, Ohio.

References

External links

1990 births
Living people
Australian expatriate baseball players in South Korea
Australian expatriate baseball players in the United States
Detroit Tigers players
Erie SeaWolves players
Hanwha Eagles players
KBO League pitchers
Lakeland Tigers players
Major League Baseball pitchers
Major League Baseball players from Australia
Perth Heat players
Sportspeople from Perth, Western Australia
Baseball people from Western Australia
Toledo Mud Hens players
West Michigan Whitecaps players
2013 World Baseball Classic players
2017 World Baseball Classic players
2023 World Baseball Classic players